The women's 60 metres event at the 2017 European Athletics Indoor Championships was held on 4 March 2017 at 9:45 (heats), on 5 March at 16:00 (semifinals) and 18:10 (final) local time.

Medalists

Records

Results

Heats

Qualification: First 4 in each heat (Q) and the next 4 fastest (q) advance to the Semifinal.

Semifinals
Qualification: First 2 in each semifinal (Q) and the next 2 fastest (q) advance to the Final.

Final

References

2017 European Athletics Indoor Championships
60 metres at the European Athletics Indoor Championships
Euro